Helguera is a surname. Notable people with the surname include:

Francisco Eppens Helguera (1913–1990), Mexican artist known for his paintings, murals and sculptures
Iván Helguera (born 1975), former Spanish footballer
Jesús Helguera (1910–1971), Mexican painter
Luis Helguera (born 1976), Spanish footballer
Pablo Helguera